Abraham Benisch (1811 – 31 July 1878, London) was an English Hebraist, editor, and journalist. He wrote numerous works in the domain of Judaism, Biblical studies, biography, and travel, and during a period of nearly forty years contributed weekly articles to the pages of the Jewish Chronicle.

Biography
Benisch was born to Jewish parents at Drosau, Bohemia, in 1811.

He studied surgery in Prague about 1836—while a commentary on Ezekiel which he had written was being published—with a view to preparing himself for a journey to Palestine. Together with his close friends and fellow students Albert Löwy and Moritz Steinschneider, he founded in 1838 the proto-Zionist secret society "Die Einheit". For some years he studied medicine at the University of Vienna, but abandoned the study before proceeding to a degree. He left Austria in 1841 to settle in England, where he devoted himself to Jewish journalism and literature.

His Hebrew learning and his actively displayed devotion to Judaism secured for him a high reputation among the Jews in England. In 1854 he became editor of the Jewish Chronicle, which position he held till 1869, resuming the editorship again from 1875 till the year of his death. His editorial influence was exerted in favor of a moderate orthodoxy. He made quite a feature of the correspondence columns of the paper. Benisch took an active part in communal affairs, and helped to found several learned societies, including the Biblical Institute and its allies, the Syro-Egyptian and the Biblical Chronological Societies. These three were afterward fused into the Society of Biblical Archaeology. He zealously promoted the formation of the Society of Hebrew Literature in 1870, and of the Anglo-Jewish Association in 1871.

Benisch died at Hornsey on 31 July 1878. He left the copyright of the Jewish Chronicle to the Anglo-Jewish Association, which, shortly after his death, sold it to Israel Davis and Sydney Montagu Samuel.

Partial bibliography

References
 
 

1811 births
1878 deaths
19th-century British male writers
19th-century British writers
19th-century British journalists
19th-century translators
Austrian Empire emigrants to the United Kingdom
British Hebraists
British Jews
British male journalists
Czech Jews
English newspaper editors
Jewish translators of the Bible
Male journalists
People from Klatovy District
Translators of the Bible into English